Mount Olivet is an unincorporated community in Marshall County, West Virginia, United States.

References

Unincorporated communities in Marshall County, West Virginia
Unincorporated communities in West Virginia